Griffiniana is a genus of crickets belonging to the family Tettigoniidae.

The species of this genus are found in Southern Africa.

Species:

Griffiniana capensis 
Griffiniana duplessisae 
Griffiniana longipes 
Griffiniana pedestris

References

Tettigoniidae